John Bradford (born 15 December 1979) is a Scottish former footballer who played for Ayr United, Dumbarton, Stenhousemuir, Stranraer, Albion Rovers and East Fife.

References

1979 births
Scottish footballers
Dumbarton F.C. players
East Fife F.C. players
Stenhousemuir F.C. players
Ayr United F.C. players
Stranraer F.C. players
Albion Rovers F.C. players
Scottish Football League players
Living people
Footballers from Irvine, North Ayrshire
Association football forwards